Qazipora Patushi is a village located in the Bandipore district of Jammu and Kashmir, India, formed by the merging of former two villages, Patushay and Qazipora.

The total geographical area of the Locality is 558.1 hectares. Qazipora Patushi has a total population of 8,096 people. There are about 1,114 houses in Qazipora Patushi.

Demographics 
According to the 2021 census of India, Qazipora Patushi has 1114 households. The literacy rate of Qazipora Patushi was 62.40% compared to 67.16% of Jammu and Kashmir. In Qazipora Patushi, Male literacy stands at 71.00% while the female literacy rate was 53.09%.

Caste Factor 
Schedule Tribe (ST) constitutes 0.40% of total population in Qazipora Patushi. There is no population of Schedule Caste (SC) in Qazipora Patushi Area of Bandipora.

Internet Service Providers 

 Jio Fiber (Availabe) Book Now
 Airtel Xtreme Fiber (Availabe) Book Now
 Net Plus Broadband (Availabe) Book Now
 Excitel Broadband (Soon)

References 

Villages in Bandipora district